is a Shinto shrine located in Gifu, Gifu Prefecture, Japan. Alternative kanji for the shrine are 本庄神社 (Honjō Jinja).  Honjō Shrine was built as a larger shrine, but it was split into three separate shrines, of which the current Honjō Shrine is one. The other two are Yakumo Shrine (八雲神社 Yakumo Jinja) and Rokujō Shrine (六条神社 Rokujō Jinja), both of which are located nearby.

History
In 1599, though, Oda Nobukatsu moved the shrine and divided it into the three mentioned above. His reasoning was that he feared a Battle of Gifu Castle between Tokugawa Ieyasu and Ishida Mitsunari. Nobukatsu's fears were confirmed the following year when the Battle of Castle took place as a precursor one month before the larger and more decisive Battle of Sekigahara.

In 1931, the village of Honjō was amalgamated into the city of Gifu and the shrine changed its festival date to April 5, to coincide with Inaba Shrine's Gifu Festival.

External links
Honjō Shrine official homepage

References

Buildings and structures in Gifu
Shinto shrines in Gifu Prefecture
995 establishments
10th-century establishments in Japan
10th-century Shinto shrines